Alburitel is a civil parish in the municipality of Ourém, Portugal. The population in 2011 was 1,179, in an area of 11.51 km2.

References

Freguesias of Ourém